Lothar Schämer (28 April 1940 – 27 December 2017) was a German professional football defender.

Schämer played his entire professional career at Eintracht Frankfurt. In the 1963–64 season, he was part of the Frankfurt squad that debuted in the new founded Bundesliga scoring the first goal with a penalty against 1. FC Kaiserslautern. Finally, Schämer appeared in 216 Bundesliga fixtures netting 24 goals. His last match for Eintracht was on the 34th of the 1972–73 season against MSV Duisburg.

Honours 
 Oberliga Süd: runners-up 1960–61, 1961–62
 DFB-Pokal: runners-up 1963–64
 UEFA Intertoto Cup: 1966–67

References

External links 
 Lothar Schämer at eintracht-archiv.de 
 

1940 births
2017 deaths
People from Darmstadt-Dieburg
Sportspeople from Darmstadt (region)
German footballers
Eintracht Frankfurt players
Bundesliga players
Association football defenders
Footballers from Hesse
Sudeten German people
People from Karlovy Vary District
West German footballers